Eric Benét is the eighth studio album by American R&B recording artist Eric Benét. It was first released by Jordan House and BMG Rights Management on October 7, 2016. Benét's first major album release in four years following the release of the reissue The Other One and the Japan-exclusive album From E to U: Volume 1,  the project features guest appearances from Tamia, Arturo Sandoval and MC Lyte. Supported by the single "Sunshine" and the remix of the track featuring Tamia, Eric Benét debuted at number 12 on the US Top R&B/Hip-Hop Albums chart.

Critical reception

AllMusic editor Andy Kellman rated the album four stars out of five and wrote: "No derailment, this picks up where The One left off, with a mature and modern sound deeply rooted in traditional R&B. Thanks in part to long-term associate Demonté Posey, who produced and wrote almost everything, it is a little friskier and funkier [...] This material never resembles an act of nostalgia, despite its intentional or unintentional references. It all stands on its own, casting the singer in a bright light, whether he's dealing out slow jams, sophisticated funk, or adult contemporary numbers."

Track listing

Notes
  denotes additional producer

Charts

Release history

References

2016 albums
Eric Benét albums